WIVR (101.7 FM) is a radio station licensed to Kentland, Indiana, and serving Newton County, Benton County, and Jasper County in Indiana, and Iroquois County, and Kankakee County in Illinois. WIVR has a country music format and is owned by Milner Media Partners, LLC.

References

External links

Country radio stations in the United States
IVR
Radio stations established in 2000
2000 establishments in Indiana